The Cibona Tower in a high-rise building located in the center of Zagreb, Croatia on Dražen Petrović Square 3, near the Savska and Kranjčevićeva street intersection. It was built in 1987.

Technical information
It is 92 meters (307 feet) tall, and it has 25 levels above ground. There is a radio mast on the roof, which increases the height of the tower to 105 meters (350 feet). , Cibona Tower is ranked 3rd by height (2nd when you include the antenna) in Croatia.

The tower is a part of the complex that comprises lower business objects, a 5,400-seat basketball hall, and an art installation.

The skyscraper is a cylinder, 25 meters (83 ft) in diameter, which reduces its diameter in four stages, and ends up with a radio mast. The facade is derived in dark steel, totally reflective glass, and black granite. The windows are not fixed. The first stage ends up on the 21st floor, second on the 23rd floor, third on the 24th floor, and the fourth on the 25th floor. The rim of the tower is held by the 26 reinforced concrete pylons, which make it resistant to a 7° Richter scale earthquake, and the impact of a smaller airplane.

History 
The tower was built in 1987 because of the Universiade that was held in Zagreb that year. The architect responsible for its design is Marijan Hržić.

The last known occupant of the tower was Agrokor, the biggest food company in Central and Eastern Europe.

As of 2018, the media reported that the tower and its surroundings were in a state of disrepair.

See also 
 List of tallest buildings in Croatia

Views of Cibona Tower

References

External links 

Cibona Tower on Emporis

Buildings and structures completed in 1987
Buildings and structures in Zagreb
Skyscraper office buildings in Croatia
Trešnjevka
Round towers